Hurunui was a parliamentary electorate in the Canterbury region of New Zealand, from 1902 (when it replaced Ashley) to 1963.

Population centres
The Representation Act 1900 had increased the membership of the House of Representatives from general electorates 70 to 76, and this was implemented through the 1902 electoral redistribution. In 1902, changes to the country quota affected the three-member electorates in the four main centres. The tolerance between electorates was increased to ±1,250 so that the Representation Commissions (since 1896, there had been separate commissions for the North and South Islands) could take greater account of communities of interest. These changes proved very disruptive to existing boundaries, and six electorates were established for the first time, including Hurunui, and two electorates that previously existed were re-established.

The Hurunui electorate was rural. In 1905, election meetings were held in Hawarden and Balcairn.

History
The Hurunui electorate was first formed for the 1902 election, when it replaced the  electorate. The first election in the new electorate was contested by five candidates: Richard Meredith of the Liberal Party, who was the incumbent from the Ashley electorate, Andrew Rutherford who also stood as a Liberal, George Forbes who stood as an Independent Liberal, as he did not gain the Liberal Party's nomination, Henry Reece, and George Thomas Pulley.  Rutherford was successful, gaining almost twice the number of votes than the second-placed candidate, Reece.

Rutherford was returned with more than twice the votes of Obed Frederick Clothier, and George Thomas Pulley came a distant third.

Forbes was successful, and started his long parliamentary career that would see him hold the electorate for the next 35 years to 1943. Forbes was Prime Minister from 1930 to 1935.

Pickering transferred to the new Rangiora electorate in 1963.

In 1954, Norman Kirk stood in Hurunui as the Labour candidate, his first venture into national (parliamentary) politics. He increased Labour's share of the vote considerably, but did not win.

Members of Parliament
The electorate was represented by four Members of Parliament.

Key

Election results

1961 by-election

1960 election

1957 election

1954 election

1951 election

1949 election

1946 election

1943 election
There were four candidates in 1943, with the election won by William Gillespie over James William Morgan.

1938 election

1935 election

1931 election

1928 election

1925 election

1922 election

1919 election

1914 election

1911 election

1908 election

1902 election

References

Bibliography

Historical electorates of New Zealand
1902 establishments in New Zealand
1963 disestablishments in New Zealand
Politics of Canterbury, New Zealand
Waimakariri District